Jaynes is a surname, and may refer to

 Cindy Jaynes (born 1959), American rear-admiral
 Dwight Jaynes, American sports journalist
 Edwin Thompson Jaynes (1922–1998), American physicist and theorist of probability
 Jeremy Jaynes (born 1974), American convicted spammer
 Julian Jaynes (1920–1997), American psychologist
 Leigh Jaynes, American freestyle wrestler
 Roderick Jaynes, name used by the Coen brothers

See also
Jayne
Janes